Grottenstein Castle is a ruined castle in the municipality of Haldenstein of the Canton of Graubünden in Switzerland.

History
The castle is not mentioned in any records until 1672 when it was a ruin.  Its location, only a few hundred meters from both Lichtenstein Castle and Haldenstein Castle indicates that it was probably built for the Lords of Lichtenstein or their relatives the Lords of Haldenstein.  It may have been built as an emergency refuge for those families.  The last member of the Lichtenstein family, Ulrich died in 1275 and passed his lands to Haldenstein family.  A relative Rudolph, was a canon in Chur until 1282, but did not inherit.  The male line of the Haldenstein family ended when Ulrich IV died at the Battle of Näfels in 1388.  His lands were inherited by a number of relatives, but by 1424 the Herrschaft of Haldenstein was owned by Ursula von Hohenems and her husband Peter von Grifensee.

In 1742 Nicolin Sererhard mentioned the castle as Krottenstein. From there, it eventually became Grottenstein.

Castle site
The castle is located south of Haldenstein on the slopes of Mount Calanda. It was built by constructing a wall across the entrance to a small cavern. Near the center of the wall, part of the main entrance still remains.

Gallery

See also
 List of castles in Switzerland

References

Chur
Castles in Graubünden
Ruined castles in Switzerland